James Richard Baxter (October 1, 1892 – July 26, 1961) was a minor league baseball player and an American football player and coach.

Minor League Baseball
Baxter played for the Toledo Mud Hens of the Southern Michigan League in 1914 and later the American Association in 1927. He also played for the Jackson Vets and Flint Vehicles of the Southern Michigan League in 1915.

College football coach
Baxter  served as the head football coach at University of Toledo for a lone season in 1918, compiling a record of 1–1.

Professional football
Baxter played for two season in the National Football League (NFL), first for the Racine Legion in 1923 and later for the Kenosha Maroons in 1924.

Head coaching record

References

External links
 
 

1892 births
1961 deaths
American football quarterbacks
American football defensive backs
Racine Legion players
Kenosha Maroons players
Flint Vehicles players
Jackson Vets players
Toledo Maroons players
Toledo Mud Hens players
Toledo Rockets football coaches
Kenyon College alumni
Sportspeople from Toledo, Ohio
Players of American football from Ohio